Helmut Körnig (12 September 1905 – 5 March 1972) was a German sprinter who competed at the 1928 and 1932 Summer Olympics. He won an individual bronze medal in the 200 m in 1928 and two team medals in the 4 × 100 m relay at both Olympics.

Körnig won national titles in the 100 m (1926, 1927 and 1930), 200 m (1926–28 and 1930), and 4 × 100 m relay (1927 and 1929–30). He set 16 indoor and 14 outdoor world records. A typhoid fever ended his career in early 1934.

Körnig had a degree in law and worked as a journalist for Berliner Tageblatt and as an assistant director for the German film company Universum Film AG. After World War II he headed the film, radio and picture division of the Federal Executive Committee of the Federation of German Trade Unions DGB in Düsseldorf. In the 1950s he became the manager of the Westfalenhallen venue in Dortmund. He initiated construction of an indoor athletic hall in the Westphalia Park, which was named Helmut Körnig Hall after his death in 1973.

References

External links
 

1905 births
1973 deaths
People from Głogów
People from the Province of Silesia
Sportspeople from Lower Silesian Voivodeship
German male sprinters
Olympic athletes of Germany
Athletes (track and field) at the 1928 Summer Olympics
Athletes (track and field) at the 1932 Summer Olympics
Olympic silver medalists for Germany
Olympic bronze medalists for Germany
Athletes from Berlin
Medalists at the 1932 Summer Olympics
Medalists at the 1928 Summer Olympics
Olympic silver medalists in athletics (track and field)
Olympic bronze medalists in athletics (track and field)